Bonne Esperance, United States Virgin Islands may refer to:
Bonne Esperance, Saint Croix, United States Virgin Islands
Bonne Esperance, Saint Thomas, United States Virgin Islands